Believe It or Not may refer to:

Believe It or Not (album), a 1979 album by Nutshell
Believe It or Not (film), a 1983 Soviet comedy film
"Theme from The Greatest American Hero (Believe It or Not)", a theme song and 1981 single
Ripley's Believe It or Not!, an American franchise which deals in bizarre events and items
Ripley's Believe It or Not! (TV series), various American documentary television series
Ripley's Believe It or Not! (1982 TV series), 1982-1986
Ripley's Believe It or Not! (2000 TV series), 2000-2003
Ripley's Believe It or Not! (Philippine TV program), 2008
Ripley's Believe It or Not!: The Riddle of Master Lu, a 1995 point-and-click adventure game released for MS-DOS
Ripley's Believe It or Not! (pinball), a pinball machine first released in 2004
"Believe It or Not", a song by Nickelback from the album The Long Road, 2003